The 2013–14 Ugandan Super League is the 47th season of the official Ugandan football championship, the top-level football league of Uganda.

Overview
The 2013–14 FUFA Super League was being contested by 16 teams, including Bright Stars FC, CRO FC and Soana FC who were promoted from the Ugandan Big League at the end of the 2013/13 season.

Participants and locations

Some of the Kampala clubs may on occasions also play home matches at the Mandela National Stadium.

League standings

Leading goalscorer
The top goalscorer in the 2013-14 season was Francis Olaki of Soana FC with 15 goals.

References

External links
 Uganda - List of Champions - RSSSF (Hans Schöggl)
 Ugandan Football League Tables - League321.com
 Uganda Premier League 2013/4 - Betstudy
 Uganda Premier League 2013/14 - SoccerPunter
 Uganda Premier League 2013/14 - Soccerway
 Uganda Super League 2013/14 - Futaa
 Uganda Super League 2013/14 - SoccerVista
 Uganda Super League 2013/14 - TablesLeague

Ugandan Super League seasons
Uganda Super League
Super League